Constant Octave van Langhendonck (3 February 1870 in Muizen – 2 September 1944 in Brussels) was a Belgian horse rider who competed in the 1900 Olympic Games. In Paris he won the gold medal in the long jumping event.

References

External links

profile
Constant Van Langhendonck's profile at Geneanet

1870 births
1944 deaths
Belgian male equestrians
Olympic gold medalists for Belgium
Olympic equestrians of Belgium
Equestrians at the 1900 Summer Olympics
Olympic medalists in equestrian
Medalists at the 1900 Summer Olympics